Froelichiella is a genus of Brazilian plants in the family Amaranthaceae. It is sometimes included in the genus Froelichia or family Chenopodiaceae.

There is one species in the genus: Froelichiella grisea

References

Amaranthaceae
Amaranthaceae genera
Monotypic Caryophyllales genera